A logical abacus is a mechanical digital computer.

Also referred to as a "logical machine", the logical abacus is analogous to the ordinary (mathematical) abacus. It is based on the principle of truth tables.

It is constructed to show all the possible combinations of a set of logical terms with their negatives, and, further, the way in which these combinations are affected by the addition of attributes or other limiting words, i.e., to simplify mechanically the solution of logical problems. These instruments are all more or less elaborate developments of the "logical slate", on which were written in vertical columns all the combinations of symbols or letters which could be made logically out of a definite number of terms. These were compared with any given premises, and those which were incompatible were crossed off. In the abacus the combinations are inscribed each on a single slip of wood or similar substance, which is moved by a key; incompatible combinations can thus be mechanically removed at will, in accordance with any given series of premises.

The principal examples of such machines are those of William Stanley Jevons (logic piano), John Venn, and Allan Marquand.

References

 — On p.55f, Jevons gives a description of his logical abacus.

Abacus
Logic
Mechanical computers